Martin Zaťovič (born 25 January 1985) is a Czech professional ice hockey player currently playing with HC Kometa Brno in the Czech Extraliga (ELH). He previously played the majority of his career with HC Karlovy Vary in the Czech Extraliga during the 2010–11 Czech Extraliga season and enjoyed a two-season tenure in the Kontinental Hockey League with HC Lada Togliatti.

References

External links
 

1985 births
Living people
HC Baník Sokolov players
Czech ice hockey forwards
Sportovní Klub Kadaň players
HC Karlovy Vary players
HC Kometa Brno players
HC Lada Togliatti players
HC Most players
Sportspeople from Přerov
HC ZUBR Přerov players
Czech expatriate ice hockey players in Russia